Combaning is a rural community in the north east part of the Riverina.  It is situated by road, about 3 kilometres west of Springdale and 13 kilometres east of Temora.  At the 2006 census, Combaning had a population of 214 people.

The place name Combaning is derived from the local Aboriginal (Yuin) word meaning 'to hold water'.

Combaning railway station
A railway station on the branch line to Lake Cargelligo served the community between 1893 and 1975.

Notes and references

Towns in the Riverina
Towns in New South Wales